Arthur Wenderrosky Sanches (born 24 February 2005), commonly known as Arthur, is a Brazilian professional footballer who plays as an midfielder for Fluminense.

Career statistics

Club

References

2005 births
Living people
Brazilian footballers
Brazil youth international footballers
Association football midfielders
Campeonato Brasileiro Série A players
Fluminense FC players
People from Nova Friburgo
Sportspeople from Rio de Janeiro (state)